Kewarra Beach is a coastal suburb of Cairns in the Cairns Region, Queensland, Australia.

Geography 

Kewarra Beach is bordered by the Coral Sea to the east and Kuranda National Park to the west. The Captain Cook Highway passes through the suburb from the south-west to the north.

History
Kewarra Beach is situated in the Djabugay (Tjapukai) traditional Aboriginal country.  The origin of the suburb name is from an Aboriginal word 'kewarra', meaning 'at the footof the rainbow'.  

The area was primarily utilised for growing sugar cane until the suburb was developed in the 1970s and 90s. The western side of the highway was developed with a golf course (Paradise Palms) with housing to the north and south.

Trinity Anglican School opened its Kewarra Beach campus in 2002.

Education 
Trinity Anglican School is a private primary (Prep-6) campus at Poolwood Road of the Trinity Anglican School at White Rock (which opened in 1983).

There are no government schools in Kewarra Beach. The nearest government primary school is Trinity Beach State School in neighbouring Trinity Beach to the east. The nearest government secondary school is Smithfield State High School in neighbouring Smithfield to the south.

Facilities 

A small shopping centre is located on Poolwood Road.
The foreshore reserve, Pelican Park, adjoins the beach. It has  a swimming enclosure that excludes marine stingers at the north end. Other reserves include Brolga Park and Crocodile Park.

Attractions 
Tourist-oriented developments include Kewarra Beach Resort.

Transport 
Sunbus bus route 111 originates on Cottlesloe Drive and terminates at Cairns Central Shopping Centre via Trinity Beach and Trinity Park.

References

External links

 

Suburbs of Cairns
Beaches of Queensland